The first match of the 2016 Rock Cup was played 10 January 2016. The competition will be a single-leg knockout tournament. The first round will be contested between second division teams, with premier division teams joining in the second round.

The winner of this competition qualifies for the 2016–17 UEFA Europa League and would be able to enter the tournament in the first qualifying round. If the 2016 Rock Cup winner also wins the 2015–16 Gibraltar Premier Division, the place reserved for the cup winner will go to the second place team from the league.

First round
The First Round draw was held 1 December 2015 and the matches were played 10–14 January 2016. All teams in this round are Gibraltar Second Division teams.

|}

Second round
The Second Round draw was held 18 January 2016 and the matches were played 10–15 February 2016.

|}

Quarter–finals
The quarter-finals draw was held 18 February 2016 and the matches were played 16–19 March 2016.

|}

Semi–finals
The semi-finals draw was held 21 March 2016 and the matches were played 23 April 2016.

|}

Final

See also
2015–16 Gibraltar Premier Division
2015–16 Gibraltar Second Division

References

External links
Gibraltar Football Association

Rock Cup
Rock Cup
Rock Cup